The Guanling Formation is a Middle Triassic (Anisian or Pelsonian in the regional chronostratigraphy) geologic formation in southwestern China.

Description 
The formation encompasses two members. The first member is primarily calcareous mudstone and dolomite, indicative of a coastal environment. The second member is a thicker marine sequence of dark micritic limestone with some dolomite. Two distinct fossil assemblages are found in the second member. The older Luoping biota preserves abundant arthropods along with fossils from other invertebrates and vertebrates, which are rare but well-preserved. The slightly younger Panxian fauna has a more diverse and common assortment of marine reptiles such as sauropterygians.

Fossil content 
Among others, the following fossils were reported from the formation:

 Atopodentatus
 Barracudasauroides
 Diandongosaurus
 Dianopachysaurus
 Honghesaurus
 Kyphosichthys
 Largocephalosaurus
 Luopingosaurus
 Luoxiongichthys
 Mixosaurus
 Qianosuchus
 Sanchiaosaurus
 Sinosaurichthys
 Sinosaurosphargis
 Wumengosaurus
 Xinminosaurus

References 

 
Geologic formations of China
Triassic System of Asia
Triassic China
Limestone formations
Dolomite formations
Mudstone formations
Lagoonal deposits
Deep marine deposits
Open marine deposits
Shallow marine deposits